
Gmina Pakosławice is a rural gmina (administrative district) in Nysa County, Opole Voivodeship, in south-western Poland.

Villages
Gmina Pakosławice contains the villages and settlements of Biechów, Bykowice, Frączków, Godkowice, Goszowice, Korzękwice, Naczków, Nowaki, Pakosławice, Prusinowice, Radowice, Reńska Wieś, Rzymiany, Słupice, Śmiłowice, Smolice, Spiny and Strobice.

Neighbouring gminas
Gmina Pakosławice is bordered by the gminas of Grodków, Kamiennik, Łambinowice, Nysa, Otmuchów and Skoroszyce.

Twin towns – sister cities

Gmina Pakosławice is twinned with:
 Mikulovice, Czech Republic

References

Pakoslawice
Nysa County